Bobby Lawrence Watkins (born May 31, 1960) is a former American football cornerback in the National Football League. He was drafted by the Detroit Lions in the second round of the 1982 NFL Draft. He played college football at Texas State.

1960 births
Living people
People from Cottonwood, Idaho
Players of American football from Idaho
American football cornerbacks
Texas State Bobcats football players
Detroit Lions players